Neea ekmanii is a species of plant in the Nyctaginaceae family. It is endemic to Cuba.  It is threatened by habitat loss.

References

ekmanii
Endangered plants
Endemic flora of Cuba
Taxonomy articles created by Polbot